The 1879 California gubernatorial election was held on September 3, 1879, to elect the governor of California.

Results

References

1879
California
gubernatorial
September 1879 events